Puerto Rico participated in the 2010 Summer Youth Olympics in Singapore.

The Puerto Rico team consisted of 15 athletes competing in 9 sports: athletics, basketball, boxing, gymnastics, sailing, swimming, table tennis, tennis and triathlon. Puerto Rico left Singapore with its first ever medal won by flyweight (51 kg) boxer and flag bearer Emmanuel Rodríguez, after winning the final round against Nauru's DJ Maaki.

Medalists

Athletics

Girls
Track and Road Events

Field Events

Basketball

Boys

Boxing

Boys

Gymnastics

Artistic Gymnastics

Boys

Sailing

Windsurfing

Swimming

Table tennis

Individual

Team

Tennis

Singles

Doubles

Triathlon

Girls

Mixed

See also

Puerto Rico at the 2010 Central American and Caribbean Games

References

External links
Competitors List: Puerto Rico

2010 in Puerto Rican sports
Nations at the 2010 Summer Youth Olympics
Puerto Rico at the Youth Olympics